Good Looking Blues is the third studio album by British band Laika. It was released through Too Pure on 28 February 2000. The album peaked at number 37 on the UK Independent Albums Chart.

Critical reception

At Metacritic, which assigns a weighted average score out of 100 to reviews from mainstream critics, Good Looking Blues received an average score of 82 based on 8 reviews, indicating "universal acclaim".

Amy Schroeder of AllMusic wrote, "even though you wouldn't call the sound upbeat, it is indeed mesmerizing, tranquil, and head-bobbing." Lydia Vanderloo of CMJ New Music Monthly said: "As on previous efforts, the songs here share an aggressive rhythmic undertow that's equal parts dub and trip-hop."

Track listing

Charts

References

External links
 

Laika (band) albums
2000 albums
Too Pure albums